Xavier Le Tourneur d'Ison, popularly known as Xavier Letourneur, is a French filmmaker and actor. One of the most respected artists in France, he has produced more than 5000 artistic works in cinema, theatre and television.

Career
He studied economics at the University of Paris X. Then he obtained a higher accounting studies diploma as well. After graduation in 1975, he started to work for a bank of the CGE - Alcatel group. He later resigned from the job in 1984. During his tenure at the bank, he enrolled in Cours Simon in  1978 where he later graduated in 1981.

After quit from the job, he played at the café theater while continuing to work at Électro Banque for two years. In 1982, he participated in the creation of the Sentier des Halles. During this period, he played and directed eight shows at the Edgar theater where he collaborated with Christian Dob and Michel Rougeron. In 1994, along with his wife, Dob and Rougeron, Letourneur created the T"héâtre le Mélo d'Amélie" and continued to produce stage plays for more than 15 years. In the meantime, he met Olivier Marchal and together produced the play Braquo.

At the end of the 1980s, Letourneur actively participated in the "Petit Théâtre de Bouvard" for three years along with Dob, Rougeron and Marchal. In 1992, he made his first television appearance. During this time, he joined with fellow director Christian Lara and co-directed seven films. Along with Eric Civanyan, he also produced five plays and four films.

Theatre work

As an actor
 1981 : Pourquoi de et mis 
 1982 : Meutres au 700 ter rue des espadrilles 
 1983/84 : Fais voir ton Cupidon 
 1983/84 : Dieu m'tripote de et mis 
 1983/89 : Les Babas cadres 
 1985 : C'est encore loin la mairie
 1987 : La Pension 
 1987/90 : Nous on fait ou on nous dit 
 1990 : Coyote saloon 
 1991 et 1997/98 : Les faux jetons 
 1992/93 : Petaouchnock
 1993/94 : Silence en coulisses 
 1994/95 : Rififoin dans les labours 
 1995/96 : Passage avide 
 1999 : Espèces menacées 
 1999/2000 : Un Monde merveilleux 
 2000 et 2010/11 : Un conseil très municipal 
 2000/02 : Les acteurs sont fatigués 
 2001 : Les désirs 
 2002 : Entorse pour une enflure 
 2003/04 : On n'avait pas dit 9 heures ?
 2004/05 : Daddy blues 
 2005 : Tout un cinéma 
 2006 : Le déclin
 2008 : Toc toc
 2010 : Réactions en chaine
 2011/12 : André le magnifique
 2013/14 : Hier est un autre jour 
 2015/16 : Sans rancune 
 2017/18 : J'aime beaucoup ce que vous faites 
 2019/20 : A vrai dire

As a director
 Union libre et Une fille impossible 
 Le bébé avec l'eau du bain 
 Bientôt les fêtes 
 Anniversaire au self 
 J'aime beaucoup ce que vous faites 
 Caumartin puis à nouveau au Palais des Glaces
 Panne de télé 
 Un Conseil très municipal 
 Tout un cinéma 
 Amour et chipolatas 
 Qui m'aime me suive 
 On choisit pas ses vacances 
 Diète party 
 Échauffements climatiques 
 Le temps du gourdin 
 Jackpot de Clément Naslin 
 L'amour est dans le poste 
 De gros dossiers ou Je la sens bien cette histoire 
 Comment lui dire 
 Franchise obligatoire

Filmography

Short films
 1981 : La Découverte 
 1982 : Merlin ou le Cours

Feature films
 1982 : Le gendarme et les gendarmettes de Jean Girault :le capitaine au côté 
 1983 : Prends ton passe-montagne, on va à la plage 
 1996 : Fantôme avec chauffeur 
 1997 : Sucre amer 
 1998 : Tout baigne 
 2000 : Papa, je crack 
 2001 : Voyage à Ouaga 
 2002 : Sexes très opposés
 2003 : Mais qui a tué Pamela Rose 
 2004 : Ne quittez pas
 2008 : L'Ennemi public 
 2010 : Tout est encore possible 
 2012 : Mais qui a retué Pamela Rose 
 2014 Escaves et Coutisanes 
 2018 Yafa

Home movies
 1998 : Un amour de cousine 
 1998 : Le Monde à l'envers 
 2000 : Le monde à l'envers : Le secret d'Alice 
 2004 : Dans la tête du tueur 
 2004 : Ils voulaient tuer 
 2007 : Les Liens du sang 
 2009 : Le Mystère Joséphine 
 2009 : L'École du pouvoir 
 2012 : La Guerre du Royal Palace 
 2015 : Un été en provence

References

External links
 

Living people
French male stage actors
French film directors
Year of birth missing (living people)